The Make-Up Artists and Hair Stylists Guild Award for Best Contemporary Hair Styling in Television and New Media Series is one of the awards given annually to people working in the television industry by the Make-Up Artists and Hair Stylists Guild (MUAHS). It is presented to hair stylists who work in television, whose work has been deemed "best" in a given year. The award was first given in 2000, during the first annual awards, and was given when the awards were brought back in 2014. During the 2001 and 2002 ceremonies, as well as ceremonies from 2015 to 2018, the awards made the distinction between regular series and miniseries/television films. This was amended in 2019, when miniseries nominees were placed alongside continuing series, while television films and specials were given their own category.

Winners and nominees

1990s

2000s

2010s

2020s

References

Contemporary Hair Styling in Television and New Media Series